Missouri Valley College is a private college that is affiliated with the Presbyterian Church (USA) and located in Marshall, Missouri. The college was founded in 1889 and supports 40 academic majors and an enrollment close to 1,500 students. Missouri Valley College is accredited by the Higher Learning Commission, a Commission of the North Central Association of Colleges and Schools.

History

Missouri Valley College was founded in 1889. The history of Missouri Valley College began during a conference at Sarcoxie, Missouri, on October 27, 1874, where the representatives of the several Presbyterian synods in the state of Missouri met to discuss founding the school. The school is affiliated with the Cumberland Presbyterian Church.

The college's original building, Old Main or Baity Hall (Old Main was renamed to honor the Rev. Dr. George P. Baity, an early graduate and president of the Board of Trustees from 1918 to 1947) was built in 1889 as a sprawling three-storey brick building with towers, turrets, gables, and Gothic adornments in the Victorian style of the era. It housed all functions of the college: classrooms, offices, gymnasiums for men and women, a chapel, dining hall, library, museum, dorms, and laboratories. Still presiding over the campus today, and listed on the National Register of Historic Places National Register of Historic Places. The Victorian era building is notable for its wooden staircase, vaulted wooden ceilings and stained glass windows located throughout the building, most notably on the third floor.

A large room on the south wing's third floor is cruciform in shape with glass windows and vaulted wooden ceilings, it has served as a chapel and gymnasium.  Renovated in the summer of 2002, it now serves a "student success" or "Learning Center".

In 1890 students planted 1,200 evergreen and deciduous trees on the campus. The arboretum has specimens of many species, including ginkgo biloba trees, American chestnuts, a sycamore, and the state's largest catalpa tree, which stands 89 feet high and 215 inches around with a crown spread of 65 feet.

Presidents
William H. Black, 1890–1926
George H. Mack, 1927–1938
Thomas H. Bibb, 1938–1943
J. Ray Cable, 1944–1948
Harold Roe Bartle, 1948–1950
M. Earle Collins, 1951–1968
W. L. Tompkins, 1968–1974
Donald C. Ziemke, 1975–1979
Robert J. Glass, 1979–1983
Earl J. Reeves, 1983–1994
J. Kenneth Bryant, 1994–2001
Chadwick B. Freeman, 2001–2004
Bonnie L. Humphrey, 2005–present

Nonprofit Leadership Alliance

From 1945 to 1952, Harold Roe Bartle served as president of Missouri Valley. In 1948 Bartle founded and contributed $100,000 toward establishing the American Humanics Foundation, now the Nonprofit Leadership Alliance, a philanthropic organization intended to prepare young people for careers in professional youth leadership in such organizations as the Boy Scouts, Camp Fire Girls, and the YWCA.  As of 2018, the Alliance had programs at more than 40 college campuses, where students could earn the Certified Nonprofit Leadership credential. Harold Roe Bartle, later served as mayor of Kansas City, Missouri, and is namesake of Bartle Hall. George Miller was also instrumental in the founding of the AHF.

Academics

The college has over 25 majors. Recently added are a nursing program, the college's first master's degree in community counseling, and various online courses.

Athletics
The Missouri Valley athletic teams are called the Vikings. The college is a member of the National Association of Intercollegiate Athletics (NAIA), primarily competing as a founding member of the Heart of America Athletic Conference (HAAC) since its inception in the 1971–72 academic year. The Vikings previously competed in the Missouri College Athletic Union (MCAU) from 1924–25 to 1970–71.

Missouri Valley competes in 29 intercollegiate varsity sports: Men's sports include baseball, basketball, bowling, cross country, football, golf, lacrosse, powerlifting, rodeo, soccer, tennis, track & field, volleyball and wrestling; while women's sports include basketball, cross country, golf, lacrosse, powerlifting, rodeo, soccer, softball, tennis, track & field, volleyball and wrestling; and co-ed sports include competitive cheer, competitive dance, eSports and shotgun sports.

Accomplishments
Football has always been at the forefront of Missouri Valley College athletics, with 17 conference championships, a small college national title, two national runner-up finishes and 13 national bowl games. In the 2006 season, the Vikings advanced to the semi-finals of the NAIA Football National Championships, before falling to the eventual National Champions.  The Vikings finished the season with a 13–1 record a #3 ranking in the final 2006 "NAIA Football Top 25 Poll."

Wrestling team accomplishments: 1991–1992, 14th nationally, four All Americans (AA); 1992–1993, 20th nationally, three AA's; 1993–1994, 13th Nationally, three AA's; 1994–1995, eighth nationally, six AA's; 1995–1996, national champions, eight AA's; 1996–1997 national champions, eight AA's; 1997–1998 national runner-up, seven AA's; 1998–1999, fifth nationally, nine AA's; 1999–2000, national runner-up, ten AA's; 2000–2001, national runner-up, nine AA's; 2001–2002, sixth nationally, seven AA's; 2002–2003, national champtions, eleven AA's; 2003–2004, third nationally, eight AA's; 2004–2005, national runner-up, nine AA's' 2005–2006, seventh nationally, five AA's.

The oldest footage of the game of basketball captured on film is that of a 1904 game involving female students at Missouri Valley College.

Notable people

Alumni
The alumni association comprises more than 16,760 members. The Office of Alumni Relations encourages alumni to become involved in alumni and college activities. Alumni are recognized by the college for meritorious activity through the Outstanding Alumnus Award, the Honorary Alumnus Award, and other special recognition.

Among the college's notable former students and alumni are:

Virgil Blossom, Superintendent of Schools of the Little Rock School District during the Little Rock Nine
Mickey Burns, TV host, writer, producer
Clarissa Chun, 5th place, 2008 Beijing Olympics (woman's wrestling-48 kg)
LC Davis, MMA star
Tonya Evinger, professional Mixed Martial Artist, former Invicta FC Bantamweight Champion, currently competing in the UFC
Lou Fette, Former Major League Baseball player. 1939 NL All-Star 
Caleb Flaxey 2014 Sochi Olympic Gold Medalist, Curling
Herbert Harris U.S. Representative from Virginia 
Ron Hall, National Football League (NFL), Pittsburgh Steelers 1959; American Football League (AFL), Boston Patriots 1961 to 1967. AFL All-Star in 1963.
Bobby Lashley (Class of 1999), professional wrestler in WWE and TNA and Mixed martial artist
Vernetta Lesforis, gold medalist at the 1999 Central American and Caribbean Championships
W. Alan McCollough, American businessman, Director of the Goodyear Tire and Rubber Company, La-Z-Boy and VF Corporation 
Ameya Pawar, Chicago Alderman 
Alan M. Powell, Businessman in Scottsdale, Arizona
Moses Regular, American football player

Faculty and staff
Benjamin Anderson, Austrian School economist, professor at MVC
Volney Ashford, football coach inducted in College Football Hall of Fame
Robert K. Enders, notable zoologist, professor at MVC
Charles W. Gehrke, chemist, researcher, entrepreneur, professor at MVC

References

External links

 
 Official athletics website

 
Universities and colleges affiliated with the Presbyterian Church (USA)
Buildings and structures in Saline County, Missouri
Educational institutions established in 1889
Education in Saline County, Missouri
Private universities and colleges in Missouri
1889 establishments in Missouri